The Metropolitan Bureau of Investigation is an 18-agency law enforcement task force in Central Florida that was set up by the Ninth Judicial Circuit Court of Florida in 1978 to target vice, narcotics, and organized crime.

References

Law enforcement agencies of Florida